The hepatorenal recess (subhepatic recess, pouch of Morison or Morison's pouch) is the subhepatic space that separates the liver from the right kidney. As a potential space, the recess is not normally filled with fluid. However, fluid can collect here in circumstances where the abdomen fills with fluid, such as hemoperitoneum. This fluid may be seen on ultrasound or computed tomography (CT scan).

Clinical importance
Since it is a potential space, the hepatorenal recess is not normally filled with fluid. However, this space becomes significant in conditions in which fluid collects within the abdomen (most commonly ascites and hemoperitoneum). The intraperitoneal fluid, be it blood, ascites, or dialysate, collects in this space and may be visualized, most commonly via ultrasound or computed tomography (CT) scanning.  As little as 30 or 40 ml of fluid in the abdominal cavity may be visualized in this space.

Early visualization of fluid in the hepatorenal recess on FAST scan may be an indication for urgent laparotomy.

Etymology 
The hepatorenal recess is also called the pouch of Morison, or Morison's pouch, after the British surgeon James Rutherford Morison.

Additional images

References 

Abdomen